The Bonsam Bepo Forest Reserve is located at Akrodie in the Ahafo Region of Ghana. It was established in 1934, and covers 124.00 km.

It is located at an altitude of 304 meters.

References

External links
A.P.E.S Wiki

Protected areas established in 1934
Forest reserves of Ghana
1934 establishments in Gold Coast (British colony)